Amihere is a surname. Notable people with this name include:

 Serwaa Amihere, Ghanaian broadcast journalist and news presenter
 Kabral Blay Amihere, Ghanaian journalist and diplomat
 Isaac Abraham Amihere, Ghanaian politician. 
 Jamie Amihere Moore, English professional footballer

Ghanaian surnames